Sanu Kumar Shrestha is a Nepali politician who is serving as Speaker of 1st Bagmati Provincial Assembly and Member of Bagmati Provincial Assembly from Kathmandu 2.

References 

Year of birth missing (living people)
Living people
Place of birth missing (living people)
Political office-holders in Nepal